The Mamiya C330 Professional is a traditional film twin-lens reflex camera introduced in the 1970s for the professional and advanced amateur photography markets. This model was 340 grams lighter than the previous model C33, which weighed 2040 grams (with 80 mm lens). The later C330f is an improvement on the C330 and was succeeded by the C330S with further improvements.

 Uses 120 and 220 rollfilms 
 With the rack and pinion bellows type focusing system, close-up photography is possible without attachments.
 Has a self-cocking one action 360° winding crank with a double exposure prevention device. Double exposure is also possible. The straight filmroll path has no right-angle turn and guarantees an absolutely flat film.
 The backplate is changeable for single-exposure photography
 Dimensions: 122 (w) × 168 (h) × 114 (d)
 Weight: 1.7 kg (with standard lens)

The Mamiya C-series cameras are one of the very few twin-lens reflex cameras with interchangeable lenses, along with the Koni-Omegaflex and Zeiss Contaflex.

Lenses
 

There are seven Mamiya Sekor lenses:

 2 wide-angle lenses 55 mm  and 65 mm 
 4 normal lenses80 mm , two versions of 80 mm   and 105 mm 
 3 telephoto lenses 135 mm , 180 mm , and 250 mm 

Every lens has its own Seikosha (chrome) or Seiko (black) leaf shutter system with a shutter speed of B, 1' -1/500 sec, X or M flash synchronisation and bulb mode.
The C330 camera has two shutter release buttons, an automatic conversion film counter 120/220, an indicator of the film in use, a removable back cover, a hexagonal distance scale rod for the different lenses, automatic parallax compensation, an automatic exposure factor indicator and interchangeable focusing screens.

Accessories

 7 interchangeable screens for focusing (matte, split image 4°, split image 6°, microprism, microprism + split image 45°, cross-hair and checkerboard pattern.
 3 types of finders: a prismfinder, a porrofinder and  a CdS-porrofinder (with a built-in CdS exposure meter).
 Three types of magnifying hoods: normal focusing hood, CdS magnifying hood and a magnifying hood 3.5× or 6×.
 Two paramenders for parallax correction
 gripholders and pistol grip
 backplates for sheet film

See also

 Mamiya C220
 Mamiyaflex

External links

 Mamiya TLR System Summary by Graham Patterson (covers all Mamiya c-series cameras)
 Mamiya C330 Professional by luis triguez

120 film cameras
Mamiya TLR cameras